Bosse-de-Nage is an American band from San Francisco, California, United States, composed of four anonymous members. Considered as a part of the blackgaze scene, the band performs an experimental black metal style that draws from post-rock, shoegaze, post-hardcore, screamo, and indie rock, with influences from Slint, Mogwai, and Godspeed You! Black Emperor. AllMusic critic Gregory Heaney wrote that the band "crafts a sound that's as comfortable expanding outward as it is contracting into a suffocating mass of needling guitars and frantic drumming." The band's lyrics touch upon various subjects, such as sex, filth, bodies, perversion, and death. Their name is taken from French symbolist Alfred Jarry's book The Exploits and Opinions of Dr. Faustroll, Pataphysician; it is the name of a monkey which may or may not have been a hallucination of the narrator.

History
After releasing a set of demos in 2006, Bosse-de-Nage signed to The Flenser record label and released its self-titled debut album, which featured recordings from 2007, in 2010. The band's second album, II was released in 2011. The album caught Profound Lore Records' attention, which released their follow-up III''' in 2012. In the same year, Bosse-de-Nage also released a split EP with San Francisco-based fellow metal band Deafheaven, Deafheaven / Bosse-de-Nage, contributing the original track, "A Mimesis of Purpose."

The band released its fourth studio album, All Fours, in 2015. In 2018, the band returned to The Flenser for “Further Still”, its fifth album.

Band members
D. – bass guitar
H. (Harry Cantwell) – drums
B. (Bryan Manning) – vocals
M. – guitar

Discography
Studio albums
 Bosse-de-Nage (2010)
 II (2011)
 III (2012)
 All Fours (2015)
 Further Still (2018)

Splits
 Deafheaven / Bosse-de-Nage (2012, with Deafheaven)

Demos
 Demo I (2006)
 Demo II'' (2006)

References

External links
  
 Bosse-de-Nage on bandcamp.

Black metal musical groups from California
Hardcore punk groups from California
Blackgaze musical groups
American screamo musical groups
American post-metal musical groups
American post-hardcore musical groups
Musical groups from San Francisco
Musical quartets
Profound Lore Records artists